The Ibanez RG2228 is the world's first mass-produced eight string electric guitar. It came out in March 2007 and was introduced in the Winter NAMM show of that year.

Specifications

Basic Information
 Scale Length - 27" (Baritone Scale)
 Neck Length - 685.8 mm
 Neck Material - Five-piece maple and wenge
 Body Material - Basswood
 Fingerboard - Rosewood with dot inlays
 Frets - 24 Jumbo Frets
 Bridge - Fixed Edge III-8, double-locking

Pickups
Neck and Bridge Pickups:
 Name - EMG 808
 Type - Active Humbucker

Strings

Notable users

 Tosin Abasi - Animals as Leaders, until Ibanez created his own signature 8-string model.
 Dino Cazares - Fear Factory, Asesino and Divine Heresy
 Ihsahn - Emperor, Thou Shalt Suffer and Peccatum
 Tony MacAlpine - Tony Macalpine band
 Fredrik Thordendal and Mårten Hagström from the Swedish tech-metal band Meshuggah use custom Ibanez eight-strings of a similar aesthetic design to the RG2228.
 Scott Hull - Pig Destroyer, Agoraphobic Nosebleed, (formerly) Anal Cunt
 Justin Lowe and Trent Hafdahl - After the Burial
 Misha Mansoor -  Periphery
 Timfy James - Hacktivist
 Josh Martin - Little Tybee
 Herman Li - DragonForce
 Kevin Armelloni - Deadalus
 Sébastien Pirotte - Deadalus
 Joshua Travis - tony danza tapdance extravaganza

References

External links
 RG2228 at Ibanez.com
 Video Demonstration
 EMG

RG2228